Nazarene Theological Seminary (NTS) is a Nazarene seminary in Kansas City, Missouri. The seminary was established by the Eleventh General Assembly in June 1944 and started its first school year in 1945 with 61 students. It moved to its current location in 1950. The seminary offers master's degrees in Divinity, Christian Education, Intercultural Studies, and Theological Studies as well as a Doctor of Ministry degree (D.Min.) and non-degree programs.

History
The Church of the Nazarene, founded in 1908, has since its beginning stressed the importance of education. It started and developed a number of denominational colleges to meet the demand of its constituents for college training, and for some time it relied on the religion departments of its colleges as the principal means for training students preparing for ministry. However, during the quadrennium of 1940-44, sentiment favoring the establishment of a central theological school grew rapidly and finally crystallized in an action of the Annual Conference of the District Superintendents held in Kansas City, January 5–6, 1944. The conference recommended that the Board of General Superintendents appoint a Seminary Commission to study the need for such an institution. On January 10, 1944, the Board of General Superintendents appointed the commission: Russell V. DeLong, chairman, M. Lunn, secretary; E.O. Chalfant; M. Kimber Moulton, and Harlan Heinmiller.

The commission reported its findings to the Eleventh General Assembly of the Church of the Nazarene held in Minneapolis in June 1944. This assembly authorized the establishment of the Seminary as a graduation institution of the Church of the Nazarene. The first Seminary Board of Trustees was then elected and the name Nazarene Theological Seminary was chosen. The Board of Trustees unanimously selected Kansas City as the Seminary's location.

At a special meeting in Kansas City, September 1944, the Board of Trustees unanimously elected Hugh C. Benner as the Seminary's first president.
Meeting in January 1945, the Board of Trustees elected the following full-time faculty: Russell V. DeLong, district superintendent of the Northwest Indiana District, as Dean and Professor of Philosophy of Religion; Ralph Earl, Eastern Nazarene College professor, as Professor of Greek and Bible; L. A. Reed, pastor of Chicago First Church of the Nazarene, as Professor of Preaching and Pastoral Ministry; Mendell Taylor, Bethany Nazarene College professor, as Registrar and Professor of Church History; and Stephen S. White, Olivet Nazarene College professor, as Professor of Theology.

The Seminary started its first school year in September 1945 in temporary quarters with 61 enrolled. The Nazarene Publishing House generously provided space for administrative offices and a classroom on the first floor of the General Editorial Building, 2901 Troost; and the management of the denominational headquarters building extended a similar courtesy in providing the Seminary with its main classroom and chapel. The library was house in the renovated coach house of the Headquarters property.

In January 1950, a  site was purchased at 1700 East Meyer Boulevard, Kansas City. An administration and classroom building was erected on this campus in 1954. A library building was added in 1966.

Presidents (1945-present)
Hugh C. Benner, 1945–1952
L.T. Corlett, 1952–1966
Eugene Stowe, 1966–1968
William M. Greathouse, 1968–1976
Stephen W. Nease, 1976–1980
Terrell C. Sanders, Jr., 1981–1992
A. Gordon Wetmore, 1992–2000
Ron Benefiel, 2000–2011
David Busic, 2011–2013
Carla Sunberg, 2014–2017
Jeren Rowell, 2017–present

See also
Nazarene International Education Association
List of Church of the Nazarene schools

References

A history of the first fifty years of the Seminary is contained in the book More Preachers Better Preachers by Dr. Harold E. Raser in 1995.

External links
Official website

 
Universities and colleges in Kansas City, Missouri
Church of the Nazarene
Educational institutions established in 1945
Seminaries and theological colleges in Missouri
1945 establishments in Missouri